Daukšiagirė Manor is a former residential manor in Daukšiagirė village, Prienai District Municipality, Lithuania.

References

Manor houses in Lithuania